John T. Fey served as Clerk of the Supreme Court of the United States from 1956 to 1958, during the Chief Justiceship of Earl Warren.

Before coming to the Supreme Court, Fey (pronounced "Fie") was a professor of tax law and the dean of the George Washington University Law School. After a relatively short tenure as clerk, he resigned to become the president of the University of Vermont. He later served as president of the University of Wyoming before entering the private sector.

References
Supreme Court Historical Society 1979 Yearbook (online version at )

Clerks of the Supreme Court of the United States
George Washington University faculty
Presidents of the University of Vermont
University of Wyoming people
Presidents of the University of Wyoming